Lin Mosei (born 30 October 1887, disappeared 11 March 1947) was a Taiwanese academic, educator, and the first Taiwanese to receive a Doctor of Philosophy (Ph.D.) degree.  He was additionally an esteemed calligrapher, and was a baptized Christian.

Lin disappeared within days of the February 28 Incident in Taiwan in 1947; he is generally believed to have been killed as a part of Chinese Nationalist Party's crackdown after the island-wide civilian uprising.

Lin's second son, Lin Tsung-yi, was an academic and educator in psychiatry.

Timeline
1887 – Born in the city of Tainan-fu, Qing Taiwan (present-day Tainan, Taiwan), to a Presbyterian minister
1916 – B.A. in philosophy from the Tokyo Imperial University.  He was the first Taiwanese graduate at the university.
1928 – M.A. in literature from Columbia University in New York.  He studied under John Dewey and Paul Monroe.
1929 – Ph.D. in education from Columbia.  His doctoral dissertation was entitled Public Education in Formosa Under the Japanese Administration: A Historical and Analytical Study of the Development and the Cultural Problems. The paper, written in English, was not translated into Chinese until 2000.
1945 – Became Dean of Arts at the National Taiwan University in Taipei.
1947 – Disappeared on March 11.

References

External links
 
 

1887 births
February 28 incident
20th-century Taiwanese educators
Taiwanese calligraphers
Taiwanese university and college faculty deans
Taiwanese Presbyterians
Year of death uncertain
People from Tainan
Teachers College, Columbia University alumni